The Maison carrée (French for "square house") is an ancient Roman temple in Nîmes, southern France; it is one of the best preserved Roman temples to survive in the territory of the former Roman Empire.

The Maison carrée inspired the neoclassical Église de la Madeleine in Paris, St. Marcellinus Church in Rogalin, Poland, and in the United States the Virginia State Capitol, which was designed by Thomas Jefferson, who had a stucco model made of the Maison carrée while he was minister to France in 1785.

History 

In about 4–7 AD, the Maison carrée was dedicated or rededicated to Gaius and Lucius Caesar, grandsons and adopted heirs of Augustus who both died young. The inscription dedicating the temple to Gaius and Lucius was removed in medieval times. However, a local scholar, Jean-François Séguier, was able to reconstruct the inscription in 1758 from the order and number of the holes on the front frieze and architrave, to which the bronze letters had been affixed by projecting tines.  According to Séguier's reconstruction, the text of the dedication read (in translation): "To Gaius Caesar, son of Augustus, Consul; to Lucius Caesar, son of Augustus, Consul designate; to the princes of youth." During the 19th century the temple slowly began to recover its original splendour, due to the efforts of Victor Grangent.

Architecture 

The Maison carrée is a classic example of Vitruvian architecture as it is nearly an exact replica of a Tuscan style Roman temple described in the writings of the famous architect Vitruvius. Raised on a 2.85 m high podium, and at 26.42 m by 13.54 m forming a rectangle almost twice as long as it is wide, the temple dominated the forum of the Roman city of Nîmes, in what is now southern France.  The façade contains a deep portico or pronaos that is almost a third of the building's length and is richly decorated in terms of its columns and capitals. This deep porch emphasizes the temple front, and distinguishes the layout from ancient Greek temples. 

It is a hexastyle design with six Corinthian columns under the pediment at either end, and pseudoperipteral in that twenty engaged columns are embedded along the walls of the cella. Above the columns, the architrave is divided into three levels with ratios of 1:2:3. Egg-and-dart decoration divides the architrave from the frieze. On three sides the frieze is decorated with fine ornamental relief carvings of rosettes and acanthus leaves beneath a row of very fine dentils. However, the refinement of the decorative carvings on the building is not nearly as precise and mathematically perfect as the decoration on the Parthenon or other Greek temples.

A large door (6.87 m high by 3.27 m wide) leads to the surprisingly small and windowless interior, where the shrine was originally housed. This is now used to house a tourist oriented film on the Roman history of Nîmes. No ancient decoration remains inside the cella.

Restorations 
The building has undergone extensive restoration over the centuries.  Until the 19th century, it formed part of a larger complex of adjoining buildings.  These were demolished when the Maison carrée housed what is now the Musée des Beaux-Arts de Nîmes (from 1821 to 1907), restoring it to the isolation it would have enjoyed in Roman times.  The pronaos was restored in the early part of the 19th century when a new ceiling was provided, designed in the Roman style.  The present door was made in 1824.

It underwent a further restoration between 1988–1992, during which time it was re-roofed and the square around it was cleared, revealing the outlines of the forum.  Sir Norman Foster was commissioned to build a modern art gallery and public library, known as the Carré d'Art, on the far side of the square, to replace the city theater of Nîmes, which had burnt down in 1952.  This provides a startling contrast to the Maison carrée but renders many of its features, such as the portico and columns, in steel and glass.  The contrast of its modernity is thus muted by the physical resemblance between the two buildings, representing architectural styles 2000 years apart.

See also
 List of Ancient Roman temples

Notes

References

External links 

Official Website of Maison carrée (English)
Website made by the City of Nîmes - Architecture and history (French)
Photos and brief text
Detailed photographs

Ancient Roman temples
Roman sites in Provence
Ancient Roman buildings and structures in France
Buildings and structures in Nîmes
Roman Nîmes
Roman religious remains in France
16 BC
Buildings and structures completed in the 1st century BC
Tourist attractions in Nîmes
Roman temples of the Imperial cult